Acleris crassa is a species of moth of the family Tortricidae. It is found in Japan (Honshu).

The length of the forewings is about 12 mm. The ground colour of the forewings is yellowish brown, sprinkled with cinnamon brownish or rusty cinnamon. The base is dark blackish brown with a violet-blue gloss and striped with rusty brown near the base. The hindwings are pale yellowish grey.

References

Moths described in 1964
crassa
Moths of Japan